HYENA (also known as Andreas Söderlund) is a gold record-selling Swedish producer, songwriter and multi-instrumentalist.

HYENA's track record contains acts such as Elias (Swedish Grammy nominated), Erik Rapp, Grace Carter, Jarryd James, Shout Out Louds, Janice (Swedish Grammy nominated)  (who he had one of the most played Swedish songs with on P3 during 2016), and Saint to name a few. He has also produced Hello Saferide's debut album, "Introducing Hello Saferide".

Andreas (vocals, guitar) was also a member of Niccokick, a guitar-driven Swedish indie rock group, formed 2001 in Båstad, Sweden.

Production and Writing

Discography

Discography

Niccokick

Album 
 The Good Times We Share Were They So Bad (2008)
 Awake From the Dead, My Dear Best Friend (2004)

Extended Play (EP) 

Turn 27 (2003)
 Run! Run! Run! (2004)

Singles 
 Love  & neon lights (2004)

References

Swedish record producers
Living people
Year of birth missing (living people)